Ben Abernathy is an editor at Madefire, a company that creates motion books. Abernathy was previously a group editor at DC Comics, and prior to that, a senior editor at WildStorm Productions, an imprint of DC Comics.

Biography

Abernathy has held editorial positions at both Dark Horse Comics and Marvel Enterprises before moving to WildStorm.

Duties include editing books in three main categories of the publishing line: Wildstorm Universe, creator-driven titles and licensed properties. In addition he edited the CMX imprint for a time.

He worked on Wildstorm: World's End, which saw a new direction for a number of titles.

Notes

References

External links
Ben Abernathy on Myspace

Living people
Year of birth missing (living people)
American editors